Kamaldeen Sulemana (born 15 February 2002), also known simply as Kamaldeen, is a Ghanaian professional footballer who plays as a winger for Premier League club Southampton and the Ghana national team.

Club career

Nordsjælland
Born in Techiman, Bono East Region, Kamaldeen was a part of the Right to Dream Academy before joining its cooperative club in Denmark, FC Nordsjælland, in January 2020. He signed a five-year deal with the club on his 18th birthday and made his debut for the club a week later, 22 February 2020, against SønderjyskE in the Danish Superliga. Kamaldeen started on the bench, but replaced Mohammed Diomande in the 61st minute.

In August 2020, he was handed shirt number 10, after the departure of Mohammed Kudus to Ajax. He has been considered as one of the most promising young talents of the Danish Superliga, regarded for his technical ability, his dribbling and his speed, making him one of the most creative players in the league. During the 2020–21 winter transfer window, his name was linked with several European clubs interested in him, in particular Ajax and Bayer Leverkusen, without this amounting to a move.

After scoring five goals in five games, Kamaldeen was voted the Superliga Player of the Month for April 2021.

Rennes
On 16 July 2021, Kamaldeen signed a five-year contract with Ligue 1 club Rennes, for a reported €20 million. Thereby, he surpassed the former Danish leagues transfer record holder,  Alexander Sørloth.

Kamaldeen made his full debut for Rennes on 8 August 2021 against Lens in the first game of the Ligue 1 season. He scored Rennes' only goal after 14 minutes in a game that ended 1–1.

Southampton
On 1 February 2023, Sulemana signed a four-and-a-half-year contract with Southampton. On 4 February 2023, Sulemana made his first Premier League appearance in a 3–0 defeat against Brentford, replacing Ibrahima Diallo at half-time.

International career
Kamaldeen received his first call-up for the Ghana national team on 25 September 2020 ahead of the game against Mali. He debuted with Ghana in a 3–0 friendly loss to Mali on 9 October 2020. Kamaldeen was also used in the friendly game against Qatar three days later, when he came on as a substitute for the last 30 minutes.

Personal life
Sulemana's father is Gonja and his mother is Dagomba. He is a Muslim.

Career statistics

Honours
Individual
 Danish Superliga Player of the Month: April 2021

References

External links
 
 Kamaldeen at Rennes' website
 

2002 births
Living people
People from Brong-Ahafo Region
Ghanaian footballers
Ghanaian Muslims
Association football wingers
Ghana international footballers
Right to Dream Academy players
FC Nordsjælland players
Stade Rennais F.C. players
Southampton F.C. players
Danish Superliga players
Ligue 1 players
Premier League players
Ghanaian expatriate footballers
Ghanaian expatriate sportspeople in Denmark
Expatriate men's footballers in Denmark
Ghanaian expatriate sportspeople in France
Expatriate footballers in France
Ghanaian expatriate sportspeople in England
Expatriate footballers in England
2021 Africa Cup of Nations players
Dagomba people
2022 FIFA World Cup players